The 2011 Russian Figure Skating Championships was held on 26–29 December 2010 in Saransk. The junior competition was held on 2–4 February 2011 in Kazan. Skaters competed in the disciplines of men's singles, ladies' singles, pair skating, and ice dancing.

The results could be used to help determine the teams for the 2011 World Championships and the 2011 European Championships.

Competitions

Medalists of most important competitions

Senior Championships

Schedule
(All times GMT+3)

 Sunday 26 December 2010
 14:00–14:30 Opening ceremony
 14:45–16:15 Ice dancing – Short dance
 16:30–18:30 Pairs – Short programs
 18:45–21:15 Men – Short skating
 Monday, December 27
 14:00–16:30 Ladies – Short programs
 16:45–19:05 Pairs – Free skating
 19:20–22:20 Men – Free skating
 Tuesday, December 28
 14:00–16:50 Ladies – Free skating
 17:05–19:05 Ice dancing – Free dance
 Wednesday, December 29
 16:00–16:30 Award ceremonies
 16:45–19:15 Exhibition skates

Results

Men

Ladies

Pairs

Ice dancing

Junior Championships
The 2011 Russian Junior Figure Skating Championships were held in Kazan on 2–4 February 2011.

Schedule
(All times GMT+3)

 February 2
 14:00 Men – Short program
 17:30 Pairs – Short program
 19:45 Ice dancing – Short dance
 February 3
 12:00 Ladies – Short program

Results

Men

Ladies

Pairs

Ice dancing

International team selections

European Championships
The team to the 2011 European Championships was announced as follows:

 At the previous European Championships, Russia earned three spots each in pair skating and ice dancing and two spots each in the singles events.
 Tatiana Volosozhar and Maxim Trankov were ineligible due to a nationality change.
 Adelina Sotnikova and Elizaveta Tuktamysheva were ineligible due to age.

Winter Universiade
The team for the 2011 Winter Universiade was announced as follows:

World Championships
The team to the 2011 World Championships was announced following the results of the European Championships.

 At the previous World Championships, Russia earned three berths in pair skating, two in ladies and ice dance, and one in men's skating.
 Tatiana Volosozhar and Maxim Trankov become eligible after completing their one-year disqualification period due to a nationality change.
 Adelina Sotnikova and Elizaveta Tuktamysheva remain ineligible due to age.

World Junior Championships
The team to the 2011 World Junior Championships was announced as follows:

References

External links
 Senior results
 Senior schedule
 Mordovia Sport – Russian Figure Skating Championships, Saransk 2011
 Junior results

Ladies SP
 1-3 Protocol
 4-6 protocol
 7-9 protocol
 10-12 protocol
 13-15 protocol
 16 protocol

Ladies FS
 Sotnikova and leonova details
 Tuktamysheva and Lipnitskaya details
 Sheveleva and Makarova details
 Shelepen and Biryukova details
 Korobeinikova and Agafanova details

Men SP
 1-3 details
 4-6 details
 7-9 details
 10-12 details
 13-15 details
 16-17 details

Men FS
 Menshov and Gachinski details
 Voronov and Bush details
 Gorshkov and Tretiakov details
 Bariev and Leushin details
 Dmitriev and Sezganov details
 Sakhmatov and Kovtun details

Pairs FS
 Volosozhar/ Trankov and Kavaguti/Smirnov
 Bazarova/Larionov and Iliushenkina/Maisuradze
 Gerboldt/Enbert and Stolbova/Klimov
 Martiusheva/Rogonov and Mukhortova/Blanchard

Free Dance
 1-2 details
 3-4 details
 5-6 details
 7-8 details
 9-10 details

Russian Figure Skating Championships
Russian Figure Skating Championships
Figure skating
Russian Figure Skating Championships
Figure skating
December 2010 sports events in Russia
January 2011 sports events in Russia